The wedding of Princess Margaret and Antony Armstrong-Jones took place on Friday, 6 May 1960 at Westminster Abbey in London. Princess Margaret was the younger sister of Queen Elizabeth II, while Antony Armstrong-Jones was a noted society photographer.

Engagement
Princess Margaret met photographer Antony Armstrong-Jones in 1958 at a dinner party at the Chelsea home of Lady Elizabeth Cavendish. The two had previously encountered each other when Armstrong-Jones was the photographer at the wedding of Margaret's friends, Lady Anne Coke and The Hon. Colin Tennant, in April 1956. In October 1959, Armstrong-Jones was invited to stay at Balmoral Castle. The public assumed he was there to photograph the royal family. They became engaged shortly after and on 26 February 1960, Clarence House announced the engagement. Armstrong-Jones presented the Princess with an engagement ring set with a ruby surrounded by a marguerite of diamonds. He had designed the ring himself after a rose in honour of Margaret's middle name.

Two days before the wedding, on 4 May, there was a white-tie ball at Buckingham Palace attended by the Prime Minister and the Archbishop of Canterbury.

Wedding

Ceremony
Margaret made her way with the Duke of Edinburgh from Clarence House in the Glass Coach, arriving at the church at 11:30. The wedding took place at Westminster Abbey and was conducted by The Most Rev. Dr. Geoffery Fisher, Archbishop of Canterbury and The Very Rev. Eric Abbott, Dean of Westminster. It was the first royal wedding to be broadcast on television and had an estimated 300 million viewers, 20 millon of which from the UK. Richard Dimbleby, Jean Metcalfe, Anne Edwards, Brian Johnston, and Wynford Vaughan-Thomas covered the event for the BBC.

Attendants
Armstrong-Jones's best man was Dr. Roger Gilliatt, son of the Queen's gynecologist. The Countess of Rosse, the groom's mother, had hoped he would choose his half-brother, Lord Oxmantown, as his best man. However, resentment of their mother's favouritism led him to reject this suggestion. On 19 March, it was announced he had chosen Jeremy Fry for the role, but Fry was convicted of "importuning for immoral purposes" after allegedly approaching a man for sex, so was replaced.

Princess Margaret was attended by eight bridesmaids:
 The Princess Anne, daughter of The Queen and The Duke of Edinburgh
 Miss Angela Nevill, daughter of Lord and Lady Rupert Nevill
 Lady Rose Nevill, daughter of The Marquess and Marchioness of Abergavenny
 The Hon. Catherine Vesey, daughter of The Viscount and Viscountess de Vesci
 Miss Sarah Lowther, daughter of Mr. and Mrs. John Lowther
 Lady Virginia Fitzroy, daughter of Earl and Countess of Euston
 Miss Annabel Rhodes, daughter of The Hon. Margaret and Mr. Denys Rhodes
 Miss Marilyn Wills, daughter of The Hon. Jean and Captain John Wills.

Music
Prior to the service, works by Johann Sebastian Bach, George Frideric Handel, Henry Purcell and William Henry Harris were played on the organ. The bride walked down the aisle to the hymn "Christ is Made the Sure Foundation" to the tune Westminster Abbey by Purcell. Throughout the service, anthems by Franz Schubert, William Byrd and Gustav Holst were sung. The recessional music, at the special request of the bride, was "Trumpet Tune and Airs" by Purcell.

Attire

The Princess wore a silk organza gown designed by Norman Hartnell. She accessorized with the Poltimore tiara, which she had purchased at auction a year earlier, and a diamond riviére of 34 old-cut diamonds given to the bride by her grandmother, Queen Mary. She carried a bouquet of white orchids. Hartnell also designed the outfits of The Queen and The Queen Mother.

Armstrong-Jones and all male members of the royal family, except for Lord Mountbatten, wore morning dress.

Guests
Notable guests in attendance included:

Relatives of the bride

House of Windsor
 Queen Elizabeth The Queen Mother, the bride's mother
 The Queen and The Duke of Edinburgh, the bride's sister and brother-in-law
 The Prince of Wales, the bride's nephew
 The Princess Anne, the bride's niece (bridesmaid)
 The Princess Royal, the bride's paternal aunt
 The Earl and Countess of Harewood, the bride's first cousin and his wife
 The Hon. Gerald and Mrs. Lascelles, the bride's first cousin and his wife
 The Duke and Duchess of Gloucester, the bride's paternal uncle and aunt
 Prince William of Gloucester, the bride's first cousin
 Prince Richard of Gloucester, the bride's first cousin
 The Duchess of Kent, the bride's paternal aunt by marriage
 The Duke of Kent, the bride's first cousin
 Princess Alexandra of Kent, the bride's first cousin
 Prince Michael of Kent, the bride's first cousin 
 Lady Patricia and The Hon. Sir Alexander Ramsay, the bride's first cousin twice removed, and her husband
 Mr Alexander Ramsay of Mar and Mistress of Saltoun, the bride's second cousin once removed, and his wife
 Princess Alice, Countess of Athlone, the bride's first cousin, twice removed and paternal great aunt by marriage

Other descendants of Queen Victoria
  The Queen of Denmark, the bride's second cousin once removed, and godmother
 The Earl Mountbatten of Burma, the bride's second cousin once removed and paternal great uncle
 The Lady Brabourne, the bride's third cousin and paternal first cousin

Bowes-Lyon family
 The Hon. Jean and Captain John Wills, the bride's first cousin and her husband
 Miss Marilyn Wills, the bride's first cousin, once removed
 The Hon. Margaret and Mr. Denys Rhodes, the bride's first cousin and her husband
 Miss Annabel Rhodes, the bride's first cousin, once removed

Relatives of the groom
 Major and Mrs. Ronald Armstrong-Jones, the groom's father and stepmother
 The Viscountess and Viscount de Vesci, the groom's sister and brother-in-law
 The Hon. Catherine Vesey, the bridegroom's niece
 The Countess and Earl of Rosse, the groom's mother and stepfather
 Lord Oxmantown, the groom's half-brother
 The Hon. Martin Parsons, the groom's half-brother

Politicians

British politicians
 The Prime Minister and Lady Dorothy Macmillan
 The Foreign Secretary

Commonwealth politicians
 Robert Menzies, Prime Minister of Australia
 John Diefenbaker, Prime Minister of Canada
 Kwame Nkrumah, Prime Minister of Ghana
 Jawaharlal Nehru, Prime Minister of India
 Ayub Khan, President of Pakistan

The wedding coincided with the 10th Commonwealth Prime Ministers' Conference held at Windsor Castle. As a result, many of the Commonwealth dignitaries attended the wedding.

Religious figures
 The Most Rev. Dr. Geoffery Fisher, Archbishop of Canterbury
 The Very Rev. Eric Abbott, Dean of Westminster

Other notable guests
 Dr. and Mrs. Roger Gilliatt (best man)
Earl and Countess of Euston
 Lady Virginia FitzRoy (bridesmaid) 
 Mr. and Mrs. John Lowther
 Miss Sarah Lowther (bridesmaid)
 The Marquess and Marchioness of Abergavenny
 Lady Rose Nevill (bridesmaid) 
 Lord and Lady Rupert Nevill 
 Miss Angela Nevill (bridesmaid)

Aftermath
Following a balcony appearance and a wedding breakfast for 150 guests at Buckingham Palace, the bride changed into her Victor Stiebel going-away outfit and they departed in an open Rolls-Royce. They spent their six-week honeymoon touring the Caribbean on HMY Britannia. On 26 May, while away on honeymoon, Camilla Fry, wife of Jeremy Fry, gave birth to Armstrong-Jones's illegitimate daughter, Polly. Allegations of this were first raised in 2004 and confirmed when Armstrong-Jones agreed to take a paternity test.

On 6 October 1961, Armstrong-Jones was raised to the peerage as Earl of Snowdon and Viscount Linley, of Nymans in the County of Sussex, by Queen Elizabeth II. He became "The Right Honourable The Earl of Snowdon" and Princess Margaret became "Her Royal Highness The Princess Margaret, Countess of Snowdon." The couple had two children, David (born 1961), now the 2nd Earl of Snowdon, and Sarah (born 1964).

The Snowdons separated in 1976, subsequently divorcing on 11 July 1978. It was the first divorce by a senior member of the royal family since that of Princess Victoria Melita of Saxe-Coburg and Gotha and Ernest Louis, Grand Duke of Hesse in 1901. On 15 December of that year, Snowdon remarried Lucy Lindsay-Hogg, separating in 2000. They had a daughter, Frances (b. 1979). On 30 April 1998, Snowdon fathered another illegitimate child, Jasper William Oliver Cable-Alexander.

After years of ill health, Princess Margaret, who never remarried, died on 9 February 2002, aged 71. Lord Snowdon died on 13 January 2017, aged 86.

References
Notes

Sources

External links
 Order of Service for the wedding

Margaret and Antony Armstrong-Jones
Margaret and Antony Armstrong-Jones
Margaret and Antony Armstrong-Jones
Princess Margaret, Countess of Snowdon
1960 in London
May 1960 events in the United Kingdom